Thiazole synthase (thiG (gene)) is an enzyme with systematic name 1-deoxy-D-xylulose 5-phosphate:thiol sulfurtransferase. This enzyme catalyses the following chemical reaction

 1-deoxy-D-xylulose 5-phosphate + 2-iminoacetate + thiocarboxy-adenylate-[sulfur-carrier protein ThiS]  2-[(2R,5Z)-2-carboxy-4-methylthiazol-5(2H)-ylidene]ethyl phosphate + [sulfur-carrier protein ThiS] + 2 H2O

H2S can provide the sulfur in vitro.

References

External links 
 

EC 2.8.1